{{Infobox book | 
| name          = Dublin: Foundation (US title The Princes of Ireland: The Dublin Saga)
| title_orig    =  
| translator    =  
| image         = Dublin foundation.jpg
| image_size = 
| caption = First edition cover
| author        = Edward Rutherfurd
| cover_artist  =  
| country       = United Kingdom
| language      = English
| series        = The Dublin Saga
| genre         = Historical novel
| publisher     = Century Hutchinson
| pub_date      = 4 March 2004
| media_type    = Print (Hardback & Paperback)
| pages         = 804 pp (first edition, hardback)
| isbn = 0-7126-8000-4
| isbn_note = (first edition, hardback)
| oclc= 54507587
| preceded_by   = 
| followed_by   = Ireland: Awakening
}}Dublin: Foundation  (2004) (also known in North America as The Princes of Ireland: The Dublin Saga or sometimes simply Dublin) is a novel by Edward Rutherfurd first published in 2004 by Century Hutchinson and then by Seal Books and Doubleday Canada.

It is a work of historical fiction and centers on a number of families and their descendants in and around the area of Ireland that is now Dublin. It begins in AD 430 with the love affair of a prince (Conall) and the daughter of an Irish chief (Deirdre) from the area of Dubh Linn . It concludes in AD 1533, with the disappearance of the Staff of Saint Patrick. Historical characters include Saint Patrick, Brian Boru, Strongbow, and King John of England, among others.

Chapters
Prologue - Emerald Sun
Dubh Linn (AD 430)
Tara (AD 430)
Patrick (AD 450)
Vikings (AD 981)
Brian Boru (AD 999)
Strongbow (AD 1167)
Dalkey (AD 1370)
The Pale (AD 1487)
Silken Thomas (AD 1533)

Publishing history
2004, UK, century Hutchinson 4 March 2004, hardback, (First edition)
2004, USA, Doubleday, pub date ? March 2004, hardback (as The Princes of Ireland: The Dublin Saga)
2004, Canada, Doubleday Canada, pub date ? March 2004, hardback (as The Princes of Ireland: The Dublin Saga)
2004, Canada, Random House Large Print Publishing, pub date ? March 2004, large print hardback (as The Princes of Ireland: The Dublin Saga)
2005, UK, Arrow Books, Pub date 5 May 2005, paperback (as Dublin)
2005, USA, Ballantine Books, Pub date ? March 2005, paperback (as The Princes of Ireland: The Dublin Saga)
2006, USA, Seal Books, Pub date ? ? 2006, paperback (as The Princes of Ireland: The Dublin Saga'')

References

2004 British novels
Historical novels
Novels by Edward Rutherfurd
Novels set in Dublin (city)
Hutchinson (publisher) books